Deileptenia is a genus of moths in the family Geometridae.

Species
 Deileptenia mandschuriaria Bremer, 1864
 Deileptenia ribeata – satin beauty (Clerck, 1759)

References
 Deileptenia at Markku Savela's Lepidoptera and Some Other Life Forms
 Natural History Museum Lepidoptera genus database

Boarmiini
Geometridae genera